Investigator Group is an island group in South Australia.

Investigator Group may also refer to the following places in South Australia:

Investigator Group Conservation Park, a former protected area
Investigator Group Wilderness Protection Area, a protected area

See also
Investigator (disambiguation)
Investigator Marine Park